In the music industry, the Published Price to Dealer (PPD) is the wholesale unit price of a recorded work.  It is often used in recording industry contracts as a basic figure for defining royalty shares.

References 

Music industry